Kootstertille is a village in Achtkarspelen in the province of Friesland, the Netherlands. It had a population of around 2500 in 2017.

History 
The village was first mentioned in 1508 as Wigher ter Tille. Kootstertille means bridge near the village of Kooten (=little houses) which was built in 1571. The settlement quickly outgrew Kooten, and both were officially merged in 1959 as Koostertille. In 1840, it was home to 132 people. The Protestant church was built in 1883. Its location along the canal which is nowadays called  started to attract industry. In the late 1930s, the canal was diverted and a little harbour was created which further stimulated development.

Gallery

References

External links

 website gemeente Achtkarspelen

Achtkarspelen
Populated places in Friesland